Laljit Singh Bhullar is an Indian politician and the MLA representing the Patti, Punjab Assembly constituency. He is a member of the Aam Aadmi Party.

Career
Bhullar worked as volunteer in Aam Aadmi party. He defeated four-time SAD MLA Adesh Partap Singh Kairon and one-time Congress MLA Harminder Singh Gill in the 2022 election. The Aam Aadmi Party gained a strong 79% majority in the sixteenth Punjab Legislative Assembly by winning 92 out of 117 seats in the 2022 Punjab Legislative Assembly election. MP Bhagwant Mann was sworn in as Chief Minister on 16 March 2022.

Member of Legislative Assembly
Bhullar was elected as the MLA in the 2022 Punjab Legislative Assembly election.  He represented the Patti, Punjab Assembly constituency in the Punjab Legislative Assembly. He took oath as a cabinet minister along with nine other MLAs on 19 March at Guru Nanak Dev auditorium of Punjab Raj Bhavan in Chandigarh. Eight ministers including Bhullar who took oath were greenhorn (first term) MLAs.

As a cabinet minister in the Mann ministry, Bhullar was given the charge of two departments of the Punjab Government:
 Department of Transport
 Department of Hospitality

Transport minister
In June 2022, CM Bhagwant Mann announced Volvo bus service between IGI Airport and different Punjab cities of the state. The tariff charged by the PRTC and PEPSU buses for the Airport were announced at half the rates being charged by the private bus operators. Mann said that this service would break the monopoly of a few families in bus business with political links.

Electoral performance

References

Living people
Punjab, India MLAs 2022–2027
Aam Aadmi Party politicians from Punjab, India
Mann ministry
Transport Ministers of Punjab, India
Year of birth missing (living people)